Elena Abramovna Fatalibekova (née Rubtsova; born 4 October 1947, in Moscow) is a Russian chess player holding the title of Woman Grandmaster (WGM) since 1977.

She is the daughter of fourth Women's World Chess Champion Olga Rubtsova. Her first great success was the shared victory of the Soviet Junior Girls' Chess Championship in 1963.

In 1970 Fatalibekova placed second in a women's international tournament at Tbilisi and the next year won international tournament in Chelyabinsk. She was awarded the title of Woman International Master in 1970. In 1974 Fatalibekova won the Women's Soviet Chess Championship.

Fatalibekova successfully played in the Women's World Chess Championship 1978. In 1976 she won the Tbilisi Women's Interzonal (ahead of Maia Chiburdanidze). In 1977 in the first round of the knock-out series of matches Fatalibekova won against Valentina Kozlovskaya in Sochi - 6 : 2 (+4 −0 =4) but in the semifinals lost to Alla Kushnir in West Berlin - 3½ : 6½ (+2 −5 =3). Fatalibekova was awarded the title of Woman Grandmaster in 1977.

She was not able to replicate this success in later Women's World Chess Championships. Fatalibekova placed 6th in the 1979 Women's Interzonal in Alicante and 8th in the 1982 Women's Interzonal in Bad Kissingen.

In 1994, Fatalibekova competed at the 31st Chess Olympiad for the Russian women's team, which also included Irina Kulish, Galina Strutinskaya, and Tatiana Roschina. She is three-time winner of the Women's World Senior Chess Championship (2000, 2001, 2004) and two-time winner of the Women's European Senior Chess Championship (2007, 2008).

References

External links
 
 
 
 

1947 births
Living people
Russian female chess players
Soviet female chess players
Chess woman grandmasters
Chess Olympiad competitors
World Senior Chess Champions
Sportspeople from Moscow